3 Riberas is a Spanish geographical indication for Vino de la Tierra wines located in the autonomous region of Navarre. Vino de la Tierra is one step below the mainstream Denominación de Origen indication on the Spanish wine quality ladder, and mirrors the Vins de pays of French wine. It acquired its Vino de la Tierra status in 2018.

Authorised Grape Varieties
The authorised grape varieties are:

 Red: Garnacha Tinta, Tempranillo, Cabernet Sauvignon, Merlot, Syrah, Graciano, Mazuela, Pinot Noir, Monastrell, Bobal, and Maturana tinta

 White: Chardonnay, Moscatel de Grano Menudo, Garnacha Blanca, Sauvignon Blanc, Viura, Malvasía, Xarello, Parellada, Riesling, Gewürztraminer, Maturana Blanca, Tempranillo Blanco, Verdejo, Albillo Mayor (Turruntés)

References

Wine regions of Spain
Spanish wine
Appellations
Wine classification